The 2020 Syracuse Orange women's soccer team represented Syracuse University during the 2020 NCAA Division I women's soccer season.  The Orange were led by head coach Nicky Adams, in her second season.  They played home games at SU Soccer Stadium.  This is the team's 24th season playing organized women's college soccer, and their 7th playing in the Atlantic Coast Conference.

Due to the COVID-19 pandemic, the ACC played a reduced schedule in 2020 and the NCAA Tournament was postponed to 2021.  The ACC did not play a spring league schedule, but did allow teams to play non-conference games that would count toward their 2020 record in the lead up to the NCAA Tournament.

The Orange finished the fall season 1–7–0, 1–7–0 in ACC play to finish in a tie for eleventh place. They did not qualify for the ACC Tournament.  The Orange did not participate in the spring season and were not invited to the NCAA Tournament.

Previous season 

The Orange finished the season 3–11–2 overall, and 1–7–1 in ACC play to finish in thirteenth place.  They did not qualify for the ACC Tournament and were not invited to the NCAA Tournament.

Squad

Roster

Updated March 11, 2021

Team management

Source:

Schedule

Source:

|-
!colspan=6 style=""| Non-Conference Regular season

Rankings

Fall 2020

Spring 2021

References

Syracuse
Syracuse Orange women's soccer seasons
2020 in sports in New York (state)